Central Valley High School is a public high school in Center Township, Beaver County, Pennsylvania, United States.  It is the only high school in the Central Valley School District (Pennsylvania). Athletic teams compete as the Central Valley Warriors in the Western Pennsylvania Interscholastic Athletic League.

Notable alumni
 Robert Foster, footballer
Jordan Whitehead, footballer

Notes and references

External links
 District Website

Public high schools in Pennsylvania
Schools in Beaver County, Pennsylvania
Education in Pittsburgh area